The ocellated turkey (Meleagris ocellata) is a species of turkey residing primarily in the Yucatán Peninsula, Mexico, as well as in parts of Belize and Guatemala. A relative of the North American wild turkey (Meleagris gallopavo), it was sometimes previously considered in a genus of its own (Agriocharis), but the differences between the two turkeys are currently considered too small to justify generic segregation.

The ocellated turkey lives only in a  range in the Yucatán Peninsula in Mexico—which includes all or part the states of Quintana Roo, Campeche, Yucatán, Tabasco, and Chiapas—as well as the northern and western parts of Belize and northern Guatemala.

The ocellated turkey was considered endangered by Mexican authorities as recently as 2002 and has been considered Near Threatened by the IUCN since 2009 (Kampichler et al. 2010). The species is believed to have experienced a decline in response to land use changes and higher than sustainable harvest by migrant workers and subsistence hunters living in the Yucatán Peninsula region of Central America. (Kampichler et al. 2010). A study conducted in the year 2011 indicated that the ocellated turkey made up a substantial amount of the diets of four prominent ethnic groups of the Yucatán Peninsula (Santos et al. 2012).

Description

The body feathers of both sexes are a mixture of bronze and green iridescent color. Although females can be duller with more green, the breast feathers do not generally differ and cannot be used to determine sex. Neither sex possesses the beard typically found in wild turkeys. Tail feathers of both sexes are bluish-grey with an eye-shaped, blue-bronze spot near the end with a bright gold tip. The spots, or ocelli (located on the tail), for which the ocellated turkey is named, have been likened to the patterning typically found on peafowl. The upper, major secondary wing coverts are rich iridescent copper. The primary and secondary wing feathers have similar barring to that of North American turkeys, but the secondaries have more white, especially around the edges.

Both sexes have blue heads with some orange or red nodules, which are more pronounced on males. The males also have a fleshy blue crown covered with nodules, similar to those on the neck, behind the snood. During breeding season this crown swells up and becomes brighter and more pronounced in its yellow-orange color. The eye is surrounded by a ring of bright red skin, which is most visible on males during breeding season. The legs are deep red and are shorter and thinner than on North American turkeys. Males over one year old have spurs on the legs that average , with lengths of over  being recorded. These spurs are much longer and thinner than on North American turkeys.

Ocellated turkeys are much smaller than any of the subspecies of North American wild turkey, with adult hens weighing about  before laying eggs and 3 kg (6–7 pounds) the rest of the year, and adult males weighing about  during breeding season.

Behavior

Turkeys spend most of the time on the ground and often prefer to run to escape danger through the day rather than fly, though they can fly swiftly and powerfully for short distances as the majority of birds in this order do when necessary. Roosting is usually high in trees away from night-hunting predators, such as jaguars, and usually in a family group.

The ocellated turkey is a generalist in terms of its feeding habits. They are known to feed on a wide variety of forage including but not limited to insects, such as beetles, moths, and leafcutter ants, grass seeds, nuts, and leaves (Sugihara and Heston 1981). The feeding rates of male ocellated turkeys have been observed to be significantly higher during January before the breeding season begins than when the breeding season is in full swing (Sugihara and Heston 1981). Prior to the breeding season, adult male turkeys have been observed in flocks usually no larger than three mature birds, whereas flocks of eight or more birds consisted of yearling turkeys and hens (Sugihara and Heston 1981).

The breeding season for the ocellated turkey begins in early February when the first gobbles are heard. The breeding season peaks in March and comes to an end by the end of April. Male ocellated turkeys engage in an elaborate, spirited display to attract females (Gonzalez et al. 1998). Ocellated turkeys use their tail fans just like North American subspecies of turkeys do; however, there are several distinct differences between the display of the ocellated and their North American cousins. Male turkeys begin the mating dance by tapping their feet against the ground in rapid succession. Next, the male birds move their tail feathers from side to side while quickly vibrating their wings and dragging the tips of them against the ground. As the male does this dance, he moves around the female making sure the dorsal surface of the tail feathers are constantly in view of the female (Gonzalez et al. 1998). Ocellated turkey poults hatch in May through July after a 28-day incubation period. Female ocellated turkeys lay 8–15 eggs in a well concealed nest on the ground. The poults are covered in a reddish brown juvenile plumage which allows them to blend into their surroundings to hide from predators. The young are precocial and able to leave the nest after one night. They then follow their mother until they reach young adulthood when they begin to range though often re-grouping to roost.

Vocalizations of the hen ocellated turkeys are similar to those of their northern relatives, however the male vocalization known as a “gobble” is quite different in comparison. The gobble begins with several low frequency "thumps", much like the sound of a small gasoline motor starting. As the tempo of thumps increases, the typical gobble is produced" (Gonzalez et al. 1998). Branton and Berryhill (2007) have observed that the male ocellated turkey does not gobble per se like the wild turkey. Rather, his song is distinct and includes some six to seven bongo-like bass tones which quicken in both cadence and volume until a crescendo is reached whereupon the bird's head is fully erect while he issues forth a rather high-pitched but melodious series of chops. The ocellated turkey will typically begin his singing 20 to 25 minutes before sunrise—similar to the wild turkey.

References

Footnotes
Gonzalez, Maria J., Howard B. Quigley, and Curtis I. Taylor. "Habitat use and Reproductive Ecology of the Ocellated Turkey in Tikal National Park, Guatemala." The Wilson Bulletin, vol. 110, no. 4, 1998, pp. 505.
Kampichler, Christian, et al. “Indication of a Species in an Extinction Vortex: The Ocellated Turkey on the Yucatan Peninsula, Mexico.” Acta Oecologica, vol. 36, no. 6, 2010, pp. 561–568.
Santos-Fita, D., EJ Naranjo, and JL Rangel-Salazar. "Wildlife Uses and Hunting Patterns in Rural Communities of the Yucatan Peninsula, Mexico." Journal of Ethnobiology and Ethnomedicine, vol. 8, no. 1, 2012, pp. 38–38.
Sugihara, George and Katherine Heston. "Field Notes on Winter Flocks of the Ocellated Turkey (Agriocharis Ocellata)." The Auk, vol. 98, no. 2, 1981, pp. 396–398.
Branton, Scott and Ray Berryhill (2007). Pavo! Pavo! The Odyssey of Ocellated Turkey Hunting. Mississippi State, Miss.: Branton Berryhill Publishers.  .

External links

 Images and movies of the ocellated turkey (Meleagris ocellata)—ARKive
 Ocellated turkey videos, photos & sounds on the Internet Bird Collection

Ocellated turkey
Birds of Belize
Birds of Guatemala
Birds of the Yucatán Peninsula
ocellated turkey
Ocellated turkey
Ocellated turkey
ocellated turkey
ocellated turkey